Heavn (stylized as HEAVN) is the debut studio album by American singer-songwriter Jamila Woods. It was released on July 15, 2016 through Jagjaguwar.

Accolades

Track listing

References

2016 debut albums
Jamila Woods albums
Jagjaguwar albums